Evantius of Vienne is a saint of the Roman Catholic Church and a former bishop of Vienne in France.
Evantius, is mentioned in the Catalog of the bishops of Vienna produced by the bishop Adon of Vienne (799-875), in his Chronicle6, .

The bishop participated in several councils during his episcopate, including: 
 the second council of Mâcon (581 or 582), 
 the third provincial council of Lyon (583), 
 the third council of Valence (May 584), 
 the second council of MÃ¢con (585).

See also
 Roman Catholic Archdiocese of Vienne#Archbishops

References

Catholic saints
Year of birth missing
Year of death missing